Leucorrhinia caudalis,  the lilypad whiteface,  is a species of dragonfly in the family Libellulidae. It is found in Austria, Belarus, Belgium, Croatia, the Czech Republic, Denmark, Estonia, Finland, France, Germany, Hungary, Latvia, Lithuania, Luxembourg, the Netherlands, Norway, Poland, Russia, Serbia and Montenegro, Slovenia, Sweden, and Ukraine. Its natural habitats are swamps and freshwater lakes. It is threatened by habitat loss.

References

External links 

Libellulidae
Dragonflies of Europe
Insects described in 1840
Taxonomy articles created by Polbot